Euxoa chimoensis is a moth of the family Noctuidae. It is found in Quebec and Labrador. It is known only from three specimens. It is considered rarely seen, but there is a possibility it is not rare in the coastal eastern arctic.

It is sometimes treated as a subspecies of Euxoa macleani.

Adults have been collected in July.

The larvae probably eat leaves, and are probably polyphagous.

External links
Species info
A Synopsis of the westermanni Group of the Genus Euxoa Hbn. (Lepidoptera: Noctuidae) With Descriptions of Two New Species

Euxoa
Moths of North America
Insects of the Arctic
Moths described in 1966